Phillip Colella is an American applied mathematician and a member of the Applied Numerical Algorithms Group at the Lawrence Berkeley National Laboratory. He has also worked at Lawrence Livermore National Laboratory. He is known for his fundamental contributions in the development of mathematical methods and numerical tools used to solve partial differential equations, including high-resolution and adaptive mesh refinement schemes. Colella is a member of the US National Academy of Sciences.

Career
Colella received his bachelor's degree in 1974, Master's degree in 1976, and Ph.D. in 1979 degree from the University of California, Berkeley, all in applied mathematics. He received the Ph.D. degree under the supervision of Alexandre Chorin. He began his research career at Lawrence Berkeley National Laboratory, University of California, California. His primary area of research involves the development of high-resolution schemes and adaptive mesh refinement methods for the solution of partial differential equations. He has also applied computational methods in a variety of scientific and engineering fields, including low-speed incompressible flows, shock wave theory, combustion, magnetohydrodynamics, and astrophysical flows. Colella has also been the leader of a project in NASA's Computational Technologies for Earth and Space Sciences, called "Block-Structured Adaptive Mesh Refinement Methods for Multiphase Microgravity Flows and Star Formation".

Awards and honors
Colella is a member of the National Academy of Sciences since 2004 and Fellow of Society for Industrial and Applied Mathematics (SIAM). He is the recipient of many honors, including the Sidney Fernbach Award from the IEEE Computer Society in 1998, given each year to one person who has made "an outstanding contribution in the application of high performance computers using innovative approaches." He has also received the SIAM/ACM prize (with John Bell) for computational science and engineering in 2003.

Selected papers

References

External links

UC Berkeley College of Letters and Science alumni
UC Berkeley College of Engineering faculty
Computational fluid dynamicists
Gonzaga College High School alumni
Numerical analysts
Members of the United States National Academy of Sciences
20th-century American mathematicians
21st-century American mathematicians
Fellows of the Society for Industrial and Applied Mathematics
1952 births
Living people